Egbert Hubert Glenn (July 13, 1916 – March 16, 2007), nicknamed "Country", was an American Negro league pitcher in the 1940s.

A native of Lewisville, North Carolina, Glenn made had played on several industry teams since the 1930s, but made his Negro leagues debut in 1943 for the Philadelphia Stars. He spent four seasons with Philadelphia, and also played for the New York Black Yankees and Indianapolis Clowns. A tall righty, Glenn was known as a "good ball player" and a "gentleman". He died in Hickory, North Carolina in 2007 at age 90.

References

External links
 and Seamheads
 Hubert 'Country' Glenn at Negro League Baseball Players Association

1916 births
2007 deaths
Indianapolis Clowns players
New York Black Yankees players
Philadelphia Stars players
Baseball pitchers
Baseball players from North Carolina
People from Lewisville, North Carolina
20th-century African-American sportspeople
21st-century African-American people